Scavenger receptor class B type 1 (SRB1) also known as SR-BI is a protein that in humans is encoded by the SCARB1 gene. SR-BI functions as a receptor for high-density lipoprotein.

Function 

Scavenger receptor class B, type I (SR-BI) is an integral membrane protein found in numerous cell types/tissues, including enterocytes, the liver and adrenal gland. It is best known for its role in facilitating the uptake of  cholesteryl esters from high-density lipoproteins in the liver. This process drives the movement of cholesterol from peripheral tissues towards the liver, where cholesterol can either be secreted via the bile duct or be used to synthesise steroid hormones. This movement of cholesterol is known as reverse cholesterol transport and is a protective mechanism against the development of atherosclerosis, which is the principal cause of heart disease and stroke.  

SR-BI is crucial in carotenoid and vitamin E uptake in the small intestine. SR-B1 is upregulated in times of vitamin A deficiency and downregulated if vitamin A status is in the normal range. 

In melanocytic cells SCARB1 gene expression may be regulated by the MITF.

Species distribution 

SR-BI has also been identified in the livers of non-mammalian species (turtle, goldfish, shark, chicken, frog, and skate), suggesting it emerged early in vertebrate evolutionary history. The turtle also seems to upregulate SR-BI during egg development, indicating that cholesterol efflux may be at peak levels during developmental stages.

Clinical significance 

SCARB1 along with CD81 is the receptor for the entry of the Hepatitis C virus into liver cells.

Preclinical research 

Although malignant tumors are known to display extreme heterogeneity, overexpression of SR-B1 is a relatively consistent marker in cancerous tissues.  While SR-B1 normally mediates the transfer of cholesterol between high-density lipoproteins (HDL) and healthy cells, it also facilitates the selective uptake of cholesterol by malignant cells.  In this way, upregulation of the SR-B1 receptor becomes an enabling factor for self-sufficient proliferation in cancerous tissue.

SR-B1 mediated delivery has also been used in the transfection of cancer cells with siRNA, or small interfering RNAs.  This therapy causes RNA interference, in which short segments of double stranded RNA acts to silence targeted oncogenes post-transcription.  SR-B1 mediation reduces siRNA degradation and off-target accumulation while enhancing delivery to targeted tissues. In "metastatic and taxane-resistant models of ovarian cancer, rHDL-mediated siren delivery improved responses.

Interactive pathway map

References

Further reading 

 
 
 
 
 
 
 
 
 
 
 
 
 
 
 
 
 
 

Scavenger receptors